Marie Charpentier (1903–1994) was the first woman to obtain a doctorate in pure mathematics in France, and the second woman, after Marie-Louise Dubreil-Jacotin, to obtain a faculty position in mathematics at a university in France.

Education
Charpentier joined the Société mathématique de France in 1930, possibly their second female member after Édmée Chandon.
She was a student of Georges Bouligand at the University of Poitiers, where she completed her thesis in 1931 with Paul Montel as chair. Her dissertation was Sur les points de Peano d'une equation différentielle du premier order [On the Peano points of a first-order differential equation].

Career
She did postdoctoral studies with George Birkhoff at Harvard University,
and was an invited speaker on geometry at the 1932 International Congress of Mathematicians in Zurich.
However, she could not obtain a faculty position in France at that time, and instead had to support herself as a teacher at the high school level.

She was appointed to her faculty position in 1942, at the University of Rennes, became full professor there, and retired in 1973.

References

1903 births
1994 deaths
French mathematicians
Date of birth missing
Date of death missing
Place of birth missing
Place of death missing
University of Poitiers alumni
French women mathematicians
20th-century French educators
20th-century French women